Philodendron squamiferum, known as Squamiferum for short is a rare species of plant in the family Araceae, native to French Guiana, Suriname, and northern Brazil. This climbing plant has leaves with five lobes and has a climbing growth habit. It is well-known among Philodendrons for its distinctive reddish stalks, which are covered in small bristles that give it a hairy appearance.

Description
Philodendron squamiferum is a rare houseplant with unique five-lobed (five-partite) dark green leaves and a scaly reddish petiole.

Toxicity
Philodendron squamiferum is highly toxic because of the presence of calcium oxalate crystals. Ingesting it can cause a burning sensation in the mouth, skin allergies, rashes, stomach aches, and in some cases, loss of breath.

References

squamiferum
Flora of South America
Plants described in 1845